Ascension Saint Francis Hospital is a teaching hospital in Evanston, Illinois, a northern suburb of Chicago. Its facilities include a Level 1 Trauma and Heart Center, and it has 270 general Acute care beds.

History 
Saint Francis Hospital  of Evanston was founded in 1900 by the pastor of the nearby St. Nicholas Church (Roman Catholic). Resurrection Health Care took over Saint Francis Hospital in 1977. When Resurrection Health Care merged with Provena Health to form Presence Health in 2011, the hospital was renamed Presence Saint Francis Hospital. The hospital was again renamed when Presence Health merged into AMITA Health in 2017. In October 2021, Saint Francis Hospital became part of the Ascension healthcare system. AMITA Health was dissolved into two healthcare systems in 2022.

References

External links

Buildings and structures in Evanston, Illinois
Hospitals in Cook County, Illinois